On the Water is a 1998 novel by Dutch author Hans Maarten van den Brink. It recounts an unlikely sporting partnership which is shattered  by the advent of World War II. The central roles are those of  Anton and David, a rowing crew from opposite sides of Amsterdam society, and Doktor Schneiderhahn, the enigmatic German rowing coach who brings them together. 

The novel will be made into a film by Dutch production company Dynamic Entertainment by the same team that adapted Philip Pullman's The Butterfly Tattoo.

Plot summary

On the Water is an intensely told tale of adolescent passion, narrated by Anton, a shy, uncomfortable outsider who harbours a yearning for a different kind of life that becomes symbolized in the river and in rowing. He joins the club, crossing the metaphorical and actual line which divides the town he lives in and forms an unlikely partnership with the calm, ironical David. Together they become a successful coxless pair, coached by an enigmatic German, Schneiderhahn. The story revels in descriptions of the physical exertion and emotional connection as it recreates pre-war Amsterdam. Telling the story in flashbacks, Anton now stands alone on a wintry evening facing a derelict and abandoned boathouse, recalling the long, hot summer of 1939 and mourning a lost world.

Film, TV or theatrical adaptations
In 2010, a feature adaption of the novel will start production in the Netherlands and United Kingdom. The team working on the film is largely the same as that which produced the award-winning adaptation of Philip Pullman's The Butterfly Tattoo. In the film, the Olympic theme will be expanded to tie in with the 2012 Olympic Games in London. The role of Doktor Schneiderhahn will also be larger than in the novel.

External links
On the Water A collection of book reviews at The Complete Review
On the Water The official website for the film adaptation.

1998 novels
Dutch drama films
20th-century Dutch novels
Novels set in Amsterdam
Dutch-language novels
Rowing in the Netherlands
Fiction set in 1939
Faber and Faber books